Phare de Gatteville, also known as Pointe de Barfleur Light, is an active lighthouse near Gatteville-le-Phare at the tip of Barfleur, Manche department, in the Normandy region of France. At a height of  it is the third tallest "traditional lighthouse" in the world.

History
Strong currents and many shipwrecks at the tip of Barfleur, the most famous of which being the White Ship, necessitated building a lighthouse at the location. In 1774 a cylindrical  granite lighthouse with a stone rectangular main building were built. The lighthouse was topped with a coal fire. It was first lit on November 1, 1775, and was originally called Phare de Barfleur (Barfleur Lighthouse).

In September 1780 the lantern was replaced with 16 oil lamps with a fire glazed glass lantern and Tourtille-Sangrain reflectors.

In 1825 an upgrade of the lens was planned, requiring raising the tower an additional , but the building proved not to be wide enough. Thus, the architect Charles-Félix Morice de la Rue drew plans for the tallest lighthouse in the world for that time. It was built  from the old lighthouse. Building took place from 1829 to 1835 and the light was first lit on April 1, 1835. The smaller tower's lantern was removed, and it was turned into a semaphore. It remains on site.

Vegetable oil was used until 1873, when it was replaced by mineral oil. On May 20, 1891, the name of the lighthouse was changed to Phare de Gatteville (Gatteville Lighthouse). On January 17, 1893, the lantern was replaced with an electric lantern.

Sautter-Harle mercury bearings were installed in 1903.

In 1944 the lighthouse was liberated without major damage and quickly returned to operation. In 1948 it was connected to the electrical network.

The lighthouse remained open to the public until 1996, when it was closed for renovation. It reopened July 5, 1997, as a lighthouse museum.

Structure and light
The tower is cylindrical with a gallery and a lantern.
It is attached to a 2-story keeper's complex which forms a U-shape around the base of the tower. Visitors can climb 365 stairs to reach the gallery.

The current light is a 1600 watt xenon lamp. One lamp is lit on clear days and two on bad weather.

Appearance in media
The 1981 film Diva by Jean-Jacques Beineix was partially shot at the lighthouse.

See also

 List of lighthouses in France
 List of tallest lighthouses in the world

References

  under "Pointe de Barfleur".
  under "Gatteville (Pointe de Barfleur) (2)"

Lighthouses completed in 1775
Towers completed in 1775
Lighthouses completed in 1835
Buildings and structures in Manche
Lighthouse museums
Lighthouses in France
Lighthouses of the English Channel
Maritime museums in France
Museums in Manche